Benjamin H. Wilson (January 25, 1925 – March 6, 1988) was a Republican member of the Pennsylvania House of Representatives. e

Biography
Wilson was the chairman of the House Finance Committee and was seeking re-election for a twelfth term when he died of a heart attack while on vacation. His widow succeeded him in office. 

Before being elected to the State House, Wilson served as Warminster Township Tax Collector and in 1980, made one bid for statewide office, auditor general, losing by a narrow margin in the GOP primary to a fellow state representative, James Knepper, who lost in the general election. 

Wilson graduated from the Pennsylvania State University with a degree in mathematics, and owned a real estate brokerage firm. 

The Benjamin H. Wilson Senior Center in Warminster Township is named after Wilson.
 

He died in office in 1988.

References

Republican Party members of the Pennsylvania House of Representatives
1988 deaths
1925 births
20th-century American politicians